Conrad Haas (1509–1576) was an Austrian or Transylvanian Saxon military engineer.
He was a pioneer of rocket propulsion. His designs include a three-stage rocket and a manned rocket.

Haas was perhaps born in Dornbach (now part of Hernals, Vienna). 
He held the post of the Zeugwart (arsenal master) of the Imperial Habsburg army under Ferdinand I. 
In 1551, Stephen Báthory, the grand prince of Transylvania invited Haas to Nagyszeben, Eastern Hungarian Kingdom (now Sibiu, Romania), where he acted as weapons engineer and also he started to teach at Klausenburg (now Cluj-Napoca).

He wrote a German-language treatise on rocket technology, involving the combination of fireworks and weapons technologies. This manuscript was discovered in 1961, in the Sibiu public records (Sibiu public records Varia II 374).
His work also dealt with the theory of motion of multi-stage rockets, different fuel mixtures using liquid fuel, and introduced delta-shape fins and bell-shaped nozzles.

In the last paragraph of his chapter on the military use of rockets, he wrote (translated):
"But my advice is for more peace and no war, leaving the rifles calmly in storage, so the bullet is not fired, the gunpowder is not burned or wet, so the prince keeps his money, the arsenal master his life; that is the advice Conrad Haas gives."

Johann Schmidlap, a German fireworks maker, is believed to have experimented with staging in 1590, using a design he called "step rockets." Before the discovery of Haas' manuscript, the first description of the three-stage rocket was credited to the artillery specialist Casimir Siemienowicz, from the Polish–Lithuanian Commonwealth, in his 1650 work, Artis Magnae Artilleriae Pars Prima ("Great Art of Artillery, Part One").

References
  "Erstlich schöne Racketten mancherley Art", Frankfurter Allgemeine Zeitung, 30 December 2009, Richard Friebe
 Conrad Haas in: Austrian Space and Rocket Pioneers. Text by B. Besser, painting by G.Deutsch.
 "The History of Manned Space Flight" - David Baker, Ph.D. - Crown Publishers, Inc, 1982, pp. 8-13
 "Conrad Haas oder Das Spiel mit dem Feuer", a film by Frieder Schuller, 1984
 
 Doru Todericiu: Preistoria rachetei moderne. Manuscrisul de la Sibiu 1529 - 1569, Editura Academiei RSR, Bucureşti, 1969
 Doru Todericiu: Preistoria rachetei moderne. Manuscrisul de la Sibiu 1529 - 1569, Editura Academiei, Bucureşti, 2008
Doru Todericiu, 'Raketentechnik im 16. Jahrhundert', Technikgeschichte 34.2 (1967), 97–114

16th-century Austrian people
Austrian scientists
Austrian soldiers
Austrian military engineers
Rocket scientists
Early rocketry
16th-century people of the Holy Roman Empire
Transylvanian Saxon people
People from Hernals
People from Sibiu
1509 births
1576 deaths